David John Pipes (born 26 April 1977) is an English cricketer.  Pipes is a right-handed batsman who bowled right-arm medium pace.  He was born in Lincoln, Lincolnshire.

Pipes made a single first-class appearance for Nottinghamshire at the age of 17 against Oxford University.  In this match he was dismissed for a single run in Nottinghamshire's first-innings by Chris Hollins, while in their second-innings he scored 11 unbeaten runs.  He also bowled 8 wicket-less overs.  He never appeared for Nottinghamshire again.

Pipes later made his debut for Lincolnshire in the 2000 Minor Counties Championship against Northumberland.  Pipes played Minor counties cricket for Lincolnshire from 2000 to 2003, which included 23 Minor Counties Championship matches and 10 MCCA Knockout Trophy matches.   He made his List A debut against Lancashire in the 2000 NatWest Trophy.  He played 4 further List A matches for Lincolnshire, the last coming against Cheshire in the 2nd round of the 2003 Cheltenham & Gloucester Trophy which was played in 2002.  In his 5 matches, he took 3 wickets at an average of 57.66, with best figures of 3/24.

References

External links
David Pipes at ESPNcricinfo
David Pipes at CricketArchive

1977 births
Living people has a daughter Kaitlin (boxer)
Cricketers from Lincoln, England
English cricketers
Nottinghamshire cricketers
Lincolnshire cricketers